|}

This is a list of electoral district results for the 1929 Queensland state election.

At the time, the voting system in Queensland was based on contingency voting, which was similar to the modern optional preferential voting system. In electorates with 3 or more candidates, preferences were not distributed if a candidate received more than 50% of the primary vote.

If none received more than 50%, all except the top two candidates were eliminated from the count and their preferences distributed between the two leaders, with the one receiving the most votes declared the winner.

Results by electoral district

Albert

Aubigny

Balonne

Barcoo

Bowen

Bremer

Brisbane

Bulimba

Bundaberg

Buranda

Burke

By-election 

 This by-election was caused by the resignation of Darby Riordan, who entered Federal politics. It was held on 2 November 1929.

Burnett

Burrum

Cairns

By-election 

 This by-election was caused by the resignation of William McCormack. It was held on 10 May 1930.

Carnarvon

Charters Towers

Chillagoe

Cook

Cooroora

Cunningham

Dalby

Eacham

East Toowoomba

Enoggera

Fassifern

By-election 

 This by-election was caused by the death of Ernest Bell. It was held on 28 June 1930.

Fitzroy

Flinders

Fortitude Valley

Gregory

Gympie

Herbert

Ipswich

Ithaca

Kelvin Grove

Kennedy

Keppel

Kurilpa

Leichhardt

Lockyer

Logan

Mackay

Maranoa

Maree

Maryborough

By-elections 

 This by-election was caused by the death of David Weir, and was held on 26 October 1929.

Merthyr

Mirani

Mitchell

Mount Morgan

Mundingburra

Murilla

Murrumba

Nanango

Normanby

Nundah

Oxley

Paddington

Port Curtis

Queenton

Rockhampton

Rosewood

Sandgate

South Brisbane

Stanley

Toombul

Toowong

Toowoomba

Townsville

Warrego

Warwick

Wide Bay

Windsor

Wynnum

See also 

 1929 Queensland state election
 Candidates of the Queensland state election, 1929
 Members of the Queensland Legislative Assembly, 1929-1932

References 

Results of Queensland elections